The R418 road is a regional road in Ireland, which runs north-south from the R448 at Kilcullen to Athy, County Kildare, and then to the N81 in Tullow, County Carlow.

En route it meets and shortly later leaves the N78 in the town of Athy, and also crosses R448 in the town of Castledermot. The section between Athy and Kilcullen was formerly part of the N78 until the latter was rerouted to Mullamast as part of the M9 motorway project.

See also
Roads in Ireland
National primary road
National secondary road

References
Roads Act 1993 (Classification of Regional Roads) Order 2006 – Department of Transport

Regional roads in the Republic of Ireland
Roads in County Kildare
Roads in County Carlow